Matthew E. Welsh Bridge is a two-lane, single-pier cantilever bridge on the Ohio River.  The bridge connects Kentucky Route 313 and Indiana State Road 135, as well as the communities of Brandenburg, Kentucky and Mauckport, Indiana.

The truss portion of the bridge is continuous across two  spans. Construction of the bridge began in August 1964 and the bridge was opened to traffic on November 19, 1966.

The bridge was named after Matthew E. Welsh, the 41st governor of Indiana.

Although 90% of the bridge is within the Commonwealth of Kentucky, it is owned and maintained by the State of Indiana.

Footnotes

See also
List of crossings of the Ohio River

Further reading
Matthew E. Walsh Bridge at Bridges & Tunnels

Buildings and structures in Harrison County, Indiana
Bridges over the Ohio River
Bridges completed in 1966
Buildings and structures in Meade County, Kentucky
Continuous truss bridges in the United States
Transportation in Harrison County, Indiana
Road bridges in Indiana
Road bridges in Kentucky
Steel bridges in the United States
Cantilever bridges in the United States
Transportation in Meade County, Kentucky
1966 establishments in Kentucky
1966 establishments in Ohio
Buildings and structures in Harrison County, Kentucky
Brandenburg, Kentucky